The Boy from Stalingrad is a 1943 American war film directed by Sidney Salkow.

Plot
Five Russian youngsters and an English boy form a guerilla band which harasses the Germans stationed in their village.

Cast
 Bobby Samarzich as Kolya
 Conrad Binyon as Grisha
 Mary Lou Harrington as Nadya
 Scotty Beckett as Pavel
 Steven Muller as Tommy Hudson
 Donald Mayo as Yuri
 John Wengraf as German Major (as John E. Wengraf)
 Erik Rolf as German Captain

See also
 List of American films of 1943

References

External links 

 
 

1943 films
American pro-Soviet propaganda films
American black-and-white films
Columbia Pictures films
Films directed by Sidney Salkow
Films set in Russia
Films about the Battle of Stalingrad
American war drama films
1940s war drama films
1943 drama films
1940s American films
1940s English-language films